Chauvetia turritellata is a species of sea snail, a marine gastropod mollusk in the family Buccinidae, the true whelks.

Description

Distribution

References

External links

Buccinidae
Gastropods described in 1835